New Campus of Henan University is a metro station of Zhengzhou Metro Line 1. The station has opened on 21 November 2019.

References 

Stations of Zhengzhou Metro
Line 1, Zhengzhou Metro
Railway stations in China opened in 2019
Railway stations in China at university and college campuses